State Senior High School 13 Bekasi (Indonesian : Sekolah Menengah Atas Negeri 13 Bekasi) is a public senior high school in Bekasi, West Java, Indonesia. State Senior High School 13 Bekasi was established in 2005 and known as USB SMAN 13 Bekasi. It is located in Jalan Pariwisata Raya Perum Bumi Bekasi Baru Utara Rawalumbu.

History
State Senior High School 13 Bekasi was established in 2005, through the decision of the Head of Education Office of Bekasi No. 421/1142 - Dik.2 dated June 5, 2005. The act was about to set a USB (id: Unit Sekolah Baru, En:New School Unit) SMA Negeri 13 Bekasi Located in District of Mustika Jaya, Bekasi.

Facilities

 Toilet
 Toilet
 Mosque
 Library
 Language and Multimedia Laboratory
 Science Laboratory
 Computer Laboratory
 Headmaster room and Administration Office
 Teacher Office
 OSIS Room
 Counseling Room
 Koperasi Siswa (Student Cooperation)
 Canteen
 Flag Ceremonial field

Extracurricular
 ROHIS (Rohani Islam)
 Pramuka/Scout (NURILAKA)
 Badminton
 Basketball
 Futsal
 Volley Ball
 Japanese Club
 Karya Ilmiah Remaja (Youth Scientific Work) (KOSMIK)
 Taekwondo
 Music and Arts
 Mading
 Choir
 Paskibra Kopasgas
 English Club
 TALISTA (Tata Lingkungan Sekolah Kita)
 Klinik Pancasila

See also

Education in Indonesia
List of schools in Indonesia

References

External links
  

Schools in Indonesia
Education in West Java